The Ivangrad District ( / ) was a former district within Montenegro. The administrative centre of the Ivangrad District was Ivangrad (modern-day Berane).

Municipalities
The district encompassed the municipalities of:
Andrijevica
Bijelo Polje
Gusinje
Ivangrad
Lozna
Mojkovac
Petnjica
Plav
Rožaje
Tomaševo

Demographics

See also
List of former municipalities of Montenegro
Administrative divisions of Montenegro

Districts of Montenegro